Bathyclupeidae is a family of Perciformes, called deep sea herrings. They are marine fishes found in tropical waters of the Atlantic Ocean, Gulf of Mexico, Indian Ocean and Pacific Ocean. They grow up to about 20 cm long.

Timeline

Genera
The following two genera, containing 10 species, are classified within the family Bathyclupeidae, although Fishbase only recognises Bathyclupeus:

 Bathyclupea Alcock, 1891
 Bathyclupea hoskynii Alcock 1891
 Bathyclupea nikparini Prokofiev2014
 Bathyclupea schroederi Dick, 1962
 Neobathyclupea Prokofiev, 2014 
 Neobathyclupea argentea (Goode & Bean, 1896)
 Neobathyclupea elongate (Trunov, 1975)
 Neobathyclupea gracilis (Fowler, 1938)
 Neobathyclupea japanotaiwana (Prokofiev, 2014)
 Neobathyclupea malayana (Weber, 1913)
 Neobathyclupea megaceps (Fowler 1938)
 Neobathyclupea melanoptera Prokofiev, Gon & Psomadakis, 2016

References

 
Perciformes families
Extant Eocene first appearances